The 1918 United States Senate elections in New Jersey were held on November 7, 1918. 

Incumbent Democratic Senator William Hughes died in office in January. Republican Governor of New Jersey Walter Evans Edge was elected to the six-year term over Democrat George LaMonte. In a special election held the same day, interim Senator David Baird Sr. (whom Edge had appointed) was elected to serve the remainder of Senator Hughes' term over Charles O'Connor Hennessy. 

In the primary election on September 24, Edge easily won the Republican nomination over George L. Record and Edward W. Gray. LaMonte won a four-cornered primary over Charles O'Connor Hennessy, Alexander Simpson, and Frank M. McDermit.

Both Baird and Hennessy were unopposed in the special election primary.

Democratic primary

Candidates
Charles O'Connor Hennessy, former State Senator from Bergen County and candidate for Governor in 1916
George LaMonte, former State Commissioner of Banking and Insurance
Frank M. McDermit, perennial candidate from Newark
Alexander Simpson, State Assemblyman from Hudson County

Results

In the soldiers' vote, included in the totals above, Hennessey won 604 to 598 votes for Simpson, 578 votes for McDermit, and 545 votes for LaMonte.

Special results
Charles O'Connor Hennessy was unopposed for the nomination to the special election. He received 51,183 votes from civilians and 1,587 votes from soldiers. In Hunterdon County, LaMonte received two votes and McDermit received one.

Republican primary

Candidates
Walter Evans Edge, Governor of New Jersey
Edward W. Gray, U.S. Representative from Jersey City
George L. Record, Jersey City corporation counsel

Results

In the soldiers' vote, included in the totals above, Edge won 2,981 to 188 votes for Record and 129 votes for Gray.

Special results
Interim Senator Baird was unopposed for the nomination to the special election. He received 96,067 votes from civilians and 1,848 votes from soldiers.

General election

Candidates
Grafton E. Day (Prohibition)
Walter Evans Edge, Governor of New Jersey (Republican)
George M. La Monte, former State Commissioner of Banking and Insurance (Democratic)
James M. Reilly, perennial candidate (Socialist)
William J. Wallace (Single Tax)

Results

See also 
1918 United States Senate elections

References

New Jersey
1918
1918 New Jersey elections